Charles Mangion (born 14 November 1952) was a Maltese politician. He was a Member of Parliament in the House of Representatives of Malta from 1987 till 2017. He has served in the government as Minister of Justice and Local Government from 1996 to 1998. He was briefly Acting Leader of the Opposition in 2008.

Personal life and family
Mangion was born in Pietà and lives in Luqa. He is married to Carmen, and they have three children.

Education
He had his primary education in Hal Luqa and continued his secondary level education at the Lyceum in Hamrun. He graduated from the University of Malta with a B.A. (Hons.) degree in English Literature (1974), and in 1982 he achieved the Doctorate in Laws. He practised his profession as notary with his company, Mangion & Mangion Ltd.

Political life
Mangion joined the Labour Party (PL) and in 1987 he was first elected to Parliament; he has continued to be elected in the following general elections. As a Member of Parliament, he represents the 6th District – Qormi, Siggiewi and Luqa.

From 1992 and 1994, he served as Shadow Minister of Home Affairs and between 1994 and 1996, he served as Shadow Minister of Industry and Local Government. Moreover, from 1992 and 1996 he served as a Deputy Speaker of the House of Representatives. In the Labour Party government led by Alfred Sant, he served as Minister of Justice and Local Government from 1996 to 1998. In May 2003, the Labour Party delegates elected him as a Deputy Leader of the Party for parliamentary affairs. 

In 2003, he became the Shadow Minister for the Economy and Finance. Sant resigned as Leader of the Labour Party in 2008, following the Labour Party's narrow defeat in the March 2008 general election, and Mangion was Acting Leader for a brief period between March and June, when Joseph Muscat was elected Leader of the Labour Party. Between 5 June and  1 October 2008, Mangion assumed the role of Leader of the Opposition.

References

Leaders of the Opposition (Malta)
Members of the House of Representatives of Malta
Maltese notaries
1952 births
Living people
Labour Party (Malta) politicians
People from Pietà, Malta
Leaders of political parties in Malta
20th-century Maltese politicians
21st-century Maltese politicians